Butusov is a Russian masculine surname originating from the nickname butus, which refers to a short, fat person; its feminine counterpart is Butusova. The surname may refer to the following notable people:

 Mikhail Butusov (1900–1963), Soviet footballer and coach and bandy player
 Vasily Butusov (1892–1971), Russian and Soviet footballer
 Vyacheslav Butusov (born 1961), Soviet and Russian singer, leader of rock band Nautilus Pompilius

References

Russian-language surnames